The Best of the Davis Sisters is a double LP/single CD album by the famous Philadelphia gospel group, released in 1978 on LP (see 1978 in music) and in 2001 on CD (see 2001 in music).  It collects 24 of their recordings made for Savoy Records between 1955 and 1968.  Popular tracks are “Twelve Gates to the City”, “Sinner Man Where You Gonna Run To”, “Blessed Quietness”, “We Need Power”, “He’ll Understand and Say Well Done”.  The lead vocals are shared between contralto Ruth “Baby Sis” Davis, mezzo-soprano Jackie Verdell, and occasionally pianist Curtis Dublin.

Song History
Recorded 9 February 1955:  “Twelve Gates to the City”, “You’ve Got the River of Jordan to Cross”, “He’ll Understand and Say Well Done”, “He’s My King”
Recorded 9 August 1955: “Won’t It Be Wonderful There”, “Rain In Jerusalem”
Recorded 17 April 1956: “Plant My Feet on Higher Ground”, “Keeping Me Alive”
Recorded 25 January 1957: “Sinner Man Where You Gonna Run To”, “Shine on Me”
Recorded 29 May 1957: “There Is a Tree on Each Side of the River”, “When I Get Inside”
Recorded 23 August 1957: “My Wonderful Counselor”
Recorded 21 January 1958” “Jonah”, What He’s Done for Me”, “Almost Home”
Recorded 17 June 1959: “We Need Power”, “Jesus Gave Me Water”
Recorded 2 July 1959: “Bye and Bye”
Recorded 16 May 1962: “He’s My Precious King”
Recorded 23 May 1962: “Tired”
Recorded c. 1967: “I Believe I’ll Go Back Home”
Recorded c. 1968: “Blessed Quietness”

Track listing

Side one
"Twelve Gates to the City" – 2:50
"Sinner Man Where You Gonna Run To" – 2:45
"I Want to Be More Like Jesus" – 2:25
"You Got the River of Jordan to Cross" – 2:40
"When I Get Inside" – 2:50
"Shine on Me" – 5:27

Side two
"Plant My Feet on Higher Ground" – 2:30
"He’s My King" – 3:15
"Rain in Jerusalem" – 2:35
"Blessed Quietness" – 2:43
"What He’s Done for Me" – 2:15
"Jonah" – 1:55

Side three
"(Jesus) He’s My Precious King" – 5:06
"We Need Power" – 2:40
"Tired" – 3:10
"Bye and Bye" – 5:20
"Jesus Gave Me Water" – 3:21
"I Believe I’ll Go Back Home" – 2:50

Side four
"He’ll Understand and Say Well Done" – 3:15
"There Is a Tree on Each Side of the River" – 3:00
"Keeping Me Alive" – 2:45
"My Wonderful Counselor" – 2:45
"Won’t It Be Wonderful There" – 2:55
"Almost Home" – 2:40

Personnel
Ruth Davis – lead vocals, background vocals
Jackie Verdell – lead vocals, background vocals
Curtis Dublin – lead vocals, piano
Thelma Davis – background vocals
Alfreda Davis – background vocals
Audrey Davis – background vocals
Cynthia Young – background vocals
Lela Dargan – background vocals
unknown – guitar
unknown - bass
unknown - organ
unknown - percussion, drums

Production
Producer: not credited, but probably Ozzie Cadena
Executive Producer: Fred Mendelson
Recording location(s):  Newark, New Jersey and/or New York City, New York
Engineers: uncertain, possibly including Rudy Van Gelder

References
Hayes, Cedric J, and Laughton, Robert (1992). Gospel Records 1943-1969: A Black Music Discography, Volume One, A to K, London, Record Information Services

External links
 The Best of the Davis Sisters available from Savoy/Malaco Records
Savoy Records Album Index

1978 greatest hits albums
The Davis Sisters albums
Gospel compilation albums
Savoy Records compilation albums